Michael Marshall is a professional drift driver, competing in the British Drift Championship.

Michael won the Pro class of the 2011 season in his Nissan Silvia S15, in 2013 he later went on to win the main Super Pro class in a 2JZ-GTE powered BMW E36 Touring after a string of consistent results.

He is also the owner of MnM Engineering, a Japanese tuning garage in Rochester, Kent.

References

Drifting drivers
English racing drivers
Living people
Year of birth missing (living people)